Acronicta gastridia is a moth of the family Noctuidae first described by Charles Swinhoe in 1895. It is found in Kashmir.

References

Acronicta
Moths of Asia
Moths described in 1895